The second USS Chinook (PC-9) is the ninth  of the United States Navy. Contract awarded 19 July 1991 to Bollinger Shipyards, her keel was laid 16 June 1993, and she was launched 26 February 1994. She was delivered 7 October 1994 and commissioned 28 January 1995.

Service History 
On 10 January 2023, Chinook, along with sister patrol ship  and guided-missile destroyer , stopped and boarded a fishing vessel in the Gulf of Oman that was smuggling over 2000 AK-47 assault rifles.

Awards
Combat Action Ribbon (2003)
Meritorious Unit Citation – 2 awards (2000, 2013 to 2015)
Navy "E" Ribbon 3 awards (1998, 2003, 2015)
National Defense Service Medal with star
Iraq Campaign Medal with two campaign stars
Global War on Terrorism Expeditionary Medal
Global War on Terrorism Service Medal

References

External links

USS Chinook Makes First Overnight U.S. Ship Visit to Iraq
FAS

Cyclone-class patrol ships
Ships built in Lockport, Louisiana
1994 ships